Madmast Barkhaa  is a 2015 Indian thriller film directed by Jaspal Singh and produced by Sundip Rale under the Singh Multimedia Creation banner. The film was scheduled for release on 29 May 2015.

Cast
Ekaansh Bhaardwaaj as Akaash
Leena Kapoor as Barkhaa
Ashish Joshi as Ranbir
Zoya Rathore as Neetu
Mushtaq Khan
Mithilesh Chaturvedi
Farida
Prakash B. Kashyap

Plot
The story revolves around Leena Kapoor, who is married to a military man named Ranbir, who has to leave, leaving Barkhaa alone. Now lonely, she begins an affair with her husband's friend Akaash. Ranbir's sister Neetu then discovers Barkhaa's affair with Akaash.

References

External links
 
 

2015 films
2010s Hindi-language films
Indian thriller drama films
Films shot in Mumbai
2015 thriller drama films
2015 drama films